Gold Seal may refer to:

 RCA Red Seal Records#Gold Seal, record label
 Harold Schafer#Gold Seal Company
 Gold Seal Novel
 Gold Seal Winery
 King of Na gold seal
 Tam's Gold Seal Drugs
 Gold Seal Ltd. v. Alberta (Attorney-General), a judgement by the Supreme Court of Canada regarding Section 121 of the Constitution Act, 1867